That Cold Day in the Park is a 1969 psychological thriller film directed by Robert Altman and starring Sandy Dennis. Based on the novel of the same name by Richard Miles and adapted for the screen by Gillian Freeman, it was filmed on location in Vancouver, British Columbia, where the events occur.  The supporting cast includes Michael Burns, Luana Anders, John Garfield Jr., and  Michael Murphy.  The picture was screened at the 1969 Cannes Film Festival outside of the main competition.

Plot
Frances notices a nineteen-year-old boy sitting in the rain in the park outside her house and invites him inside. The boy does not speak but appears to understand everything. Frances allows him to bathe and eat, then buys him new clothes the next day. That night the boy visits his parents and younger siblings then returns to his small apartment with his older sister Nina and explains what has happened to him.

The next day the boy returns bearing homemade cookies and unexpectedly encounters the maid, Mrs. Parnell. Frances invites him in and sends Mrs. Parnell away. Mrs. Parnell remarks that the cookies are burnt before leaving but Frances opens an expensive bottle of wine to accompany the cookies. She holds one-sided conversations and flirts with the boy, developing a strong attachment. The following day the boy allows his sister Nina to use Frances's bath while Frances is away having a contraceptive diaphragm fitted and dispensed at a local family planning clinic.

When Charles, an older suitor from Frances's lawn bowls group, visits that night, Frances locks the door to the boy's room while she rebuffs the man's advances until he leaves. She then inserts the diaphragm and enters the boy's room and asks him to make love to her but is distraught to find that the bed is merely stuffed with dolls.

The boy sneaks back into his room at Frances's house and sleeps until the next day, when he finds that all of the doors and windows are nailed shut. He confronts Frances and she apologizes but insists that she wants things to remain as they are, leaving him locked in the house as she goes out to a bar. She notices a woman sitting alone and invites her to come spend the night with the boy but the woman becomes upset. A man overhears and helps Frances find a prostitute named Sylvia at a nearby diner. Frances brings Sylvia home and locks her in the room with the boy then listens through the door as they have intercourse. Overcome with emotion, Frances enters the room and stabs Sylvia through the heart, killing her. The boy desperately searches for an exit but Frances tells him that he can stay with her and that he does not have to be afraid.

Cast

Themes
Writer Frank Caso identified themes of the film as including obsession, schizophrenia and personality disorder, and linked the film to director Robert Altman's later films Images (1972) and 3 Women (1977), declaring them a trilogy.

Critical reception
Roger Ebert of the Chicago Sun-Times gave the film a negative review, declaring that while it was well-shot, the plot was too convoluted and absurd to generate any suspense.

See also
 List of American films of 1969

References

External links
 
 The Robert Altman Film That Got Away (TCM Movie Morlocks)
  (essay by Michael Turner)
 UCLA Film & Television Archive (note by Shannon Kelley)
 

1969 films
1969 drama films
1960s psychological thriller films
American drama films
American independent films
American psychological thriller films
1960s English-language films
Films based on American novels
Films directed by Robert Altman
Films scored by Johnny Mandel
Films set in Vancouver
Films shot in Vancouver
1960s American films